The Brazilian Cultural Center (abbreviated CCB) is an institution subordinated to the Brazilian diplomatic missions in each country, being the main instrument for the execution of the Brazilian cultural policy abroad.

Formerly it was known as the Center of Brazilian Studies or Center for Brazilian Studies (Centro de Estudos Brasileiros).

There are Brazilian Cultural Centers currently in Angola, Bolivia, Cape Verde, Chile, Colombia, Costa Rica, Dominican Republic, Ecuador, El Salvador, Finland, Germany, Guinea Bissau, Guyana, Haiti, Italy, Lebanon, Mexico, Mozambique, Nicaragua, Panama, Paraguay, Peru, São Tomé and Príncipe, South Africa, Spain, Suriname, the United States, Uruguay and Venezuela.

The centers are also home to the CELPE-Bras exams.

References

External links
 
 The history of the cultural centers and institutes, in Portuguese

Brazilian culture
Cultural centers
Cultural promotion organizations
Foreign relations of Brazil
Portuguese-language education
Cultural centers in Brazil
Cultural diplomacy